, often referred to simply as Gatoh Move, is a Japanese Joshi puroresu (women's professional wrestling) promotion established in 2012 by Emi Sakura. The promotion is known for hosting shows in Tokyo at Ichigaya Chocolate Square, where there is no wrestling ring, but instead a small performing space in the shape of a square.

The promotion's Japanese language name "Gatōmūbu", written as a yojijukugo, is derived from the Japanese expression , while also evoking the French word "gâteau" (French for "cake") and the English word "move".

History

Early history (2012–2019) 

On January 7, 2012, Emi Sakura, founder of Ice Ribbon, departed the promotion and traveled to Thailand. While in Thailand, Emi Sakura met Prachapoom “Pumi” Boonyatud, a long-time wrestling fan. By meeting Boonyatud, Sakura learned that there were many fans of professional wrestling in Thailand, which led to the two creating Gatoh Move Pro Wrestling (Gatoh Move) in February 2012. Originally, the promotion was named Bangkok Girls Pro Wrestling (BKK Pro), but was re-branded as Gatoh Move in May 2012. 

In March 2016, Gatoh Move introduced their first non-IWA Japan branded championship, the Asia Dream Tag Team Championship, with Mizuki and Saki being crowned the inaugural champions on March 26. There have been ten tag team champions since 2016, with Calamari Drunken Kings (Chris Brookes and Masahiro Takanashi) being the current titleholders. On September 22, 2017, Gatoh Move crowned their first Super Asia Champion, when Riho defeated "Kotori" in the finals of a tournament to become the inaugural champion. Riho left Gatoh Move in June 2019, while reigning as the inaugural Super Asia Champion. This left the championship  vacant until a new champion was crowned in 2021. 

In November 2019, Gatoh Move held its final show in Thailand, while still remaining active in Japan.

Launch of ChocoPro (2020–present) 
In response to the COVID-19 pandemic lockdowns in Japan, Gatoh Move began airing a YouTube exclusive show, ChocoPro, on March 29, 2020, with Minoru Suzuki wrestling against Baliyan Akki in the main event of the inaugural episode.

In February 2021, Emi Sakura and Mei Suruga represented Gatoh Move in the Women's World Championship Eliminator Tournament for All Elite Wrestling (AEW), however, neither managed to win the tournament. On March 22, 2021, the Super Asia Championship was revived during the 99th episode of ChocoPro, where a championship match between Minoru Fujita and Baliyan Akki was announced for day 2 of the 100th Show Anniversary of ChocoPro on March 28. At ChocoPro 100 day 2, Fujita won the title.

Roster

Current wrestlers

Alumni

Championships

Current

Retired

Tournaments

References

External links 
  
 

Japanese women's professional wrestling promotions